Coleophora acmura is a moth of the family Coleophoridae that is endemic to Malawi.

References

External links

acmura
Endemic fauna of Malawi
Moths of Africa
Moths described in 1914